The following lists events that happened during 1954 in South Vietnam.

Events

February
 February 10 - After authorizing $385 million over the $400 million already budgeted for military aid to Vietnam, President of the United States Dwight D. Eisenhower warns against his country's intervention in Vietnam.

July
 July 21 - The Geneva Conference sends French forces to the south, and Vietnamese forces to the north, of a ceasefire line, and calls for elections to decide the government for all of Vietnam by July 1956. Failure to abide by the terms of the agreement leads to the establishment de facto of regimes of North Vietnam and South Vietnam, and the Vietnam War.

August
 August 1 - The First Indochina War ends with the Vietnam People's Army in North Vietnam, the Vietnamese National Army in South Vietnam, the Kingdom of Cambodia in Cambodia, and the Kingdom of Laos in Laos, emerging victorious against the French Army.

References

 
South
Years of the 20th century in South Vietnam
South Vietnam
1950s in South Vietnam
South Vietnam